Daniel Navarro García (born 18 July 1983) is a Spanish professional road bicycle racer, who currently rides for UCI ProTeam .

Career

Navarro was born in Salamanca. Having been one of Alberto Contador's domestiques for most of his career, he left  at the end of the 2012 season, and joined  on a two-year contract from the 2013 season onwards. In 2013, Navarro won the Vuelta a Murcia. He later had his first top ten grand tour finish, finishing 9th overall in the 2013 Tour de France. He had to abandon the 2014 Tour de France due to some intense stomach pain. At the 2014 Vuelta a España, he obtained the biggest victory of his career on Stage 13, a medium-mountain stage. He went on to finish 10th overall that year.

Major results

2001
 2nd Road race, National Junior Road Championships
2004
 5th Overall Circuito Montañés
2008
 4th Overall Deutschland Tour
 5th Overall Volta a Catalunya
2009
 7th Gran Premio di Lugano
 9th Overall Tour de l'Ain
2010
 1st Stage 5 Critérium du Dauphiné
2012
 3rd Overall Tour de l'Ain
1st Stage 3
 3rd Overall Tour Méditerranéen
2013
 1st Vuelta a Murcia
 5th Overall Critérium du Dauphiné
 9th Overall Tour de France
 10th Overall Vuelta a Andalucía
2014
 8th Overall Vuelta a Andalucía
 9th Overall Critérium du Dauphiné
 10th Overall Vuelta a España
1st Stage 13
 10th Vuelta a Murcia
2016
 9th Overall Vuelta a Andalucía
 9th Overall Volta a la Comunitat Valenciana
 9th Vuelta a Murcia
2017
 8th Boucles de l'Aulne
  Combativity award Stage 19 Vuelta a España
2018
 2nd Overall Route d'Occitanie
 7th Overall Tour of Oman
 9th Overall Critérium du Dauphiné
2021
 10th Overall Volta ao Algarve
  Combativity award Stage 14 Vuelta a España

Grand Tour general classification results timeline

References

External links

1983 births
Living people
Sportspeople from Salamanca
Spanish male cyclists
Cyclists from Castile and León
Spanish Vuelta a España stage winners
2014 Vuelta a España stage winners